The Rape of Europa is a painting commissioned by Władysław IV Vasa from the Italian artist Guido Reni, completed between 1637 and 1639 and showing the abduction of Europa by Zeus in the form of a bull. It was later collected by Denis Mahon, who loaned it to the National Gallery, to which it was presented in 2013 by the Trustees of Sir Denis Mahon's Charitable Trust through the Art Fund.

References and sources
References

Sources

1639 paintings
Collections of the National Gallery, London
Paintings of Europa (consort of Zeus)
Paintings of Cupid
Paintings by Guido Reni